Frank Duck Brings 'Em Back Alive is a 1946 animated short film produced by Walt Disney Productions and released by RKO Radio Pictures. In this installment of the Donald & Goofy series, Donald Duck appears as "Frank Duck", a jungle explorer determined to capture a live "wild man", played by Goofy. The film was directed by Jack Hannah and features the voices of Clarence Nash as Donald and Pinto Colvig as Goofy.

The character Frank Duck and the title of the film are spoofs of Frank Buck and his 1930 book Bring 'Em Back Alive which was adapted into a 1932 documentary film.

Plot
Goofy appears as a wild man living in an African jungle, gracefully swinging from vine to vine (a nod to Tarzan).

Employed by the Ajax Circus, Frank Duck (Donald) arrives in the jungle on a river boat in search of a wild man. After Goofy bungles an attempt to kill Frank, Frank presents the illiterate wild man with a contract which the wild man eventually eats. Frank tries to capture the wild man and put him into a cage, but the wild man escapes, seemingly unintentionally, and helps Frank load the empty cage onto his boat.

Upon realizing his mistake, Frank angrily returns with the cage and continues to chase the wild man until he chases him into a lion's den. Viewing them as food, the lion walks into the den and starts chasing them. In the ensuing chaos, Frank and the wild man find themselves wearing each other's clothes. The lion chases them back to Frank's boat, which the wild man hops into and drives away, leaving Frank to be chased by the lion.

Voice cast
 Donald Duck: Clarence Nash
 Goofy: Pinto Colvig

Releases
1946 – theatrical release
1992-2000 – Donald's Quack Attack: episode 5

Home media
The short was released on December 6, 2005 on Walt Disney Treasures: The Chronological Donald, Volume Two: 1942-1946.

Notes

External links
Frank Duck Brings 'em Back Alive at The Encyclopedia of Animated Disney Shorts
Frank Duck Brings 'em Back Alive at the Internet Movie Database
Frank Duck Brings 'Em Back Alive at the Big Cartoon DataBase

1946 animated films
1946 films
1940s Disney animated short films
1946 adventure films
Donald Duck short films
Goofy (Disney) short films
Films directed by Jack Hannah
Films produced by Walt Disney
Films scored by Oliver Wallace
Films about hunters
Jungle adventure films